The Amintore Galli Theatre (or Teatro Amintore Galli) in Rimini, Italy, was opened in 1857, is the city's principal theatre. Originally called Municipal Theatre Vittorio Emanuele II, it was renamed for the composer Amintore Galli. Construction began in 1843 based on a Neo-classical design by Luigi Poletti. In 1943, when Allied bombing during World War 2 left nothing but the facade and part of the foyer. The building was restored, and it reopened in 2019.

References

External links

Buildings and structures in Rimini